Martin Vaculík (born 5 April 1990) is a Slovak motorcycle speedway rider who is riding for the Stal Gorzów Wielkopolski in the Polish Speedway Ekstraliga.

Career 
On the 6 May 2008, Vaculík gained a Polish speedway licence (Licencja "Ż") at Toruń. and from 4 June 2008 he has taken part in the Polish Championships as a Polish domestic rider.

In 2012, Vaculik won his first ever Grand Prix as part of the 2012 World Championship, he won the 2012 Speedway Grand Prix of Poland in Gorzów. The following year he won the 2013 Speedway European Championship. After missing the World Championship from 2014 until 2016 he returned in 2017 and won the 2017 Speedway Grand Prix of Slovenia. He won his third Grand Prix during the 2018 Speedway Grand Prix series when winning the 2018 Speedway Grand Prix of Poland II. 

His only venture into British speedway (in 2018) ended in unfortunate circumstances after he broke an ankle riding for Leicester Lions in only his second outing with them.

In 2019 he rode strongly and finished in 5th place in the World Championship but suffered several injuries that affected his 2020 and 2021 performances.

Vaculík finished in 9th place (despite injury problems) during the 2022 Speedway World Championship, after securing 91 points during the 2022 Speedway Grand Prix, which included winning the Czech Republic and Toruń Grand Prix. He broke his shoulder during a Polish league match. He was selected as a full time rider for the 2023 Speedway Grand Prix.

Major results

World individual Championship
2012 Speedway Grand Prix - 11th (including Gorzów grand prix win)
2013 Speedway Grand Prix - 14th
2017 Speedway Grand Prix - 9th (including Slovenian grand prix win)
2018 Speedway Grand Prix - 13th (including Gorzów grand prix win)
2019 Speedway Grand Prix - 5th
2020 Speedway Grand Prix - 9th 
2021 Speedway Grand Prix - 12th 
2022 Speedway Grand Prix - 9th (including Czech Republic & Toruń grand prix wins)

World junior Championships 
 Individual U-21 World Championship
 2007 - 12th place in the Semi-final 2
 2008 -  Pardubice - 5th place (9 pts)
 2009 - 16th place in the Semi-Final 1

European Championships 
 Speedway European Championship
 2013 - European Champion
 Individual European Championship
 2008 - withdrew from the Qualifying Round 3
 Individual U-19 European Championship
 2007 -  Częstochowa - 6th place (10 pts + 4th in Rune-Off)
 2009 -  Tarnów - 3rd place (13 pts + 2nd in Run-Off)

Speedway World Championships Results

Speedway European Championship Results

See also 
 Slovakia national speedway team

References 

Slovak speedway riders
Polish speedway riders
1990 births
Living people
Polish people of Slovak descent
People from Žarnovica District
Sportspeople from the Banská Bystrica Region
Place of birth missing (living people)